Usatove rural hromada is a hromada in Odesa Raion of Odesa Oblast in southwestern Ukraine. Population: 

The hromada consists of 15 villages:
 Avhustivka
 Berehove
 Chobotarivka
 Cherevychne
 Illinka
 Kovalivka
 Lativka
 Marynivka
 Naberezhne
 Nova Emetivka
 Nova Kovalivka
 Protopopivka
 Stara Emetivka
 Tykhe
 Usatove (residence)

Until 18 July 2020, the hromada belonged to Biliaivka Raion. The raion was abolished in July 2020 as part of the administrative reform of Ukraine, which reduced the number of raions of Odesa Oblast to seven. The area of Biliaivka Raion was merged into Odesa Raion.

References

Odesa Raion
Hromadas of Odesa Oblast